Luís Filipe Vítorino Cunha (born 5 December 1964 in Lisbon) is a former Portuguese sprinter. He represented his country at the 1988, 1992, and 1996 Summer Olympics as well as one outdoor and two indoor World Championships. In addition, he won two medals in the 200 metres at the Ibero-American Championships.

He later worked as the sprints and hurdles head coach for the Singapore athletics team.

International competitions

1Did not finish in the final

Personal bests
Outdoor
100 metres – 10.34 (+1.0 m/s, Maia 1996)
200 metres – 20.71 (Mexico City 1988)
Indoor
60 metres – 6.78 (Barcelona 1995)
200 metres – 21.50 (Hague 1989)

References

All-Athletics

1964 births
Living people
Athletes from Lisbon
Portuguese male sprinters
Olympic athletes of Portugal
Athletes (track and field) at the 1988 Summer Olympics
Athletes (track and field) at the 1992 Summer Olympics
Athletes (track and field) at the 1996 Summer Olympics
World Athletics Championships athletes for Portugal